Nick Weber (born 4 May 1995) is a German footballer who last played for Borussia Dortmund II. He plays as a striker. He made his professional debut in the 3. Liga on 3 September 2013 against MSV Duisburg.

In July 2013 he joined 1. FC Nürnberg on a three-year deal but his contract was revoked on 16 August 2013 and he returned to Borussia Dortmund.

References

External links

1995 births
Living people
German footballers
People from Lippstadt
Sportspeople from Arnsberg (region)
Footballers from North Rhine-Westphalia
Association football defenders
Borussia Dortmund II players
3. Liga players
Germany youth international footballers